Huriwa District is a district in the southeastern Banaadir region of Somalia. It includes the northeastern neighborhoods of the national capital, Mogadishu.

References

External links
Administrative map of Huriwa District

Districts of Somalia
Banaadir